Friedrich Karm ( – 3 October 1980) was an Estonian international footballer who scored 9 goals in 13 games for the Estonian national side. He was also a bandy player.

References

1907 births
1980 deaths
Footballers from Tallinn
People from Kreis Harrien
Estonian footballers
Estonia international footballers
Association footballers not categorized by position
Estonian bandy players